Joy Mintie Goff-Marcil (born June 23, 1968) is an American politician who served as a member of the Florida House of Representatives for the 30th district from 2018 to 2022.

Career
Goff-Marcil was elected in the general election on November 6, 2018, winning 53 percent of the vote over 47 percent of Republican candidate Bob Cortes. Previously, she served for six years on the Maitland City Council.

References

Goff-Marcil, Joy
Living people
21st-century American politicians
21st-century American women politicians
Women state legislators in Florida
1968 births